Wohl model may refer to:
 Wohl equation of state: an empirical model for a real gas proposed by A. Wohl
 an empirical model for the excess Gibbs free energy of mixing which has been formulated for ternary solutions by K. Wohl (1946, 1953)

References

Thermodynamics